Catherine Richards (born 1952) is a Canadian new media artist. Richards is known for her work with early virtual reality technologies. She was the first artist to use VR technology in a work of art in Canada, which was incorporated in her 1991 artwork Spectral Bodies.

Richards is Professor of Media Arts at the University of Ottawa.

Career 
Catherine Richards' work explores the spectator and information technology relationship, which she sees as the "jam in the electro-magnetic sandwich." She deals with both old and new types of technology, exploring the volatile sense of self as we shift our boundaries, a process in which new technologies play a starring role.

Richards has exhibited internationally at major venues including the 2004 Sydney Biennale. Her work has been discussed in publications by major theorists in the field including Katherine Hayles and Frances Dyson, and has been included in key surveys such as Art & Science Now, edited by Stephen Wilson. Richards is well known for collaborating with scientists and won the Artist in Residence for Research Fellowship (AIRes) at the National Research Council of Canada, 2002–2005, and is a 1993 recipient of the Petro Canada Media Arts prize from Canada Council for the Arts for Spectral Bodies.  Her work on virtuality and new media is considered groundbreaking in setting the aesthetic terrain, realm of artistic intervention and substantive issues.

Richards was the first and sole artist to be awarded University Research Chair at the University of Ottawa. As a model for other universities, it is part of an on-going movement across North America to accept art as research within universities, a goal in which Richards has played a significant pioneering role.

Selected exhibitions  

Richards' work was featured in the 2005 group exhibition Resonances at the Zentrum für Kunst und Medientechnologie in Karlsruhe, Germany. She was included in the 2004 Biennale of Sydney.

Published and video artworks  
Spectral Bodies (1991) video artwork utilizes the juxtaposition of short narratives to reveal how the self can be lost if the body is lost.

Body in Ruins (1986) published in Body invaders: panic sex in America is a photo piece, composed of video stills and text, which explores the uncertainty of the body in virtual reality.

Awards and fellowships

References

External links
 SHIVERING - Research creation project
 
 V tape artist Catherine Richards
 Method and Apparatus for Finding Love
 Virtual Bodies

1952 births
Living people
Canadian contemporary artists
Interactive art
Canadian multimedia artists
Artists from Ottawa
York University alumni
University of Ottawa alumni
Academic staff of the University of Ottawa
Canadian women artists